Félix Vigeveno (25 March 1881 – 6 September 1955) was a Dutch épée, foil and sabre fencer. He competed at three Olympic Games.

References

External links
 

1881 births
1955 deaths
Dutch male épée fencers
Olympic fencers of the Netherlands
Fencers at the 1906 Intercalated Games
Fencers at the 1920 Summer Olympics
Fencers at the 1924 Summer Olympics
Fencers from Amsterdam
Dutch male foil fencers
Dutch male sabre fencers
20th-century Dutch people